The Supreme Court of the United States has heard numerous cases in the area of tax law. This is an incomplete list of those cases.

Article One

Section 8, Clause 1

Section 9, clause 4

Section 10, clause 2

See also
 History of taxation in the United States
 Legal history of income tax in the United States
 United States Tax Court
 Lists of United States Supreme Court cases

Tax law
τ
Taxation